Christopher Richard Todd (born 22 August 1981) is a Welsh retired footballer who played as a defender and current assistant manager of Yeovil Town.

Playing career

Swansea City
Born in Swansea, Todd began his career as a trainee with his home town club, Swansea City, turning professional in August 1999. He made his debut on 10 March 2001 at home in a 1–1 draw with Northampton Town, going on to make 46 appearances before being released in June 2002.

Drogheda United
Todd then moved to Republic of Ireland, where he spent a season with Drogheda United.

Exeter City
He returned to English football with Exeter City in January 2003. Although he was unable to prevent Exeter being relegated from the Football League that season, he remained with the club, and was consistently a first-team regular.

Upon Glenn Cronin's departure during the 2006 off-season, Todd was appointed captain of Exeter City for the 2006–07 season.

Torquay United
Todd joined local rivals Torquay United in June 2007 for a fee of £7,500. and quickly became a regular in the newly relegated Conference National side.

First loan at Salisbury City
With his treatment for his leukaemia going well, Todd returned to training and on 2 February 2009, joined Salisbury City on loan to regain match fitness.

Return to Torquay United
After a successful loan spell at Salisbury, he returned to Torquay for the last month of the 2008–09 season. Todd went straight back into the first team and, during this month, he won the 'Man of the Match' award for the Conference National Play-off Final, helping Torquay win the game and promotion to League Two.

Second loan at Salisbury City
However, the following season, Todd lost his place in the first team about a quarter of the way through the season and found himself sitting on the bench. This was when Salisbury took him back on loan, after being given special dispensation by the Conference board due to an injury and suspension crisis.

Newport County
In January 2010, Todd joined Conference South leaders Newport County on loan for the remainder of the 2009–10 season. Newport were crowned 2009–10 Conference South champions with a record 103 points, 28 points ahead of second placed Dover Athletic.

He was released by Torquay on 15 May 2010, along with six other players and joined Newport County on a permanent deal.

Forest Green Rovers
Todd signed a 2-year contract for Forest Green Rovers on 25 May 2011. Todd made his Rovers league debut in the live televised fixture against Stockport County on 12 August 2011. Todd failed to complete the match though as he left the pitch injured and it was later revealed he would need surgery to repair a torn hamstring that would keep him out for five months.

Loan at Hereford United
In October 2012, Todd joined Hereford United on a month-long loan. He appeared 7 times in all competitions for Hereford and returned to Forest Green at the end of his loan spell in November.

Eastleigh
On 10 January 2013, Todd left Forest Green and signed for Eastleigh on a free transfer, signing an 18-month contract.

Truro City
On 14 October 2016, Todd signed a short-term contract with Truro City.

Managerial career
On 15 October 2015, Todd was appointed player-manager of Eastleigh. The club finished the 2015–16 season in 7th place in the National League. On 17 August 2016, Todd was relieved of his duties as both manager and player after just four matches of the 2016–17 season.
On 10 October 2018, Todd was announced as the new manager of National League South side Gloucester City, but was sacked 3 January 2019 after a 15-game winless run.

On 21 September 2019, Todd returned to Torquay United as manager for the club's U18 squad.

On 8 June 2022, Todd left Torquay to join Yeovil Town as assistant manager, reuniting him with his former team-mate Chris Hargreaves.

Personal life
On 19 November 2008, it was announced that Todd had been diagnosed with chronic myeloid leukaemia He was able to return to football in February 2009.

In September 2011, Todd released a book titled "More Than Football; In The Blood". He wrote and published the book himself to raise money for leukaemia and lymphoma research.

In September 2012, Todd sang as part of the 'Big C choir' at the Royal Albert Hall in the 2012 Sunflower Jam concert in aid of charities supporting cancer. A documentary, following the progress of the choir, aired on Channel 4 in October 2012.

Todd has appeared in the short film Meet Again, as a soldier fighting in the Second World War.

Career statistics

Managerial statistics

References

External links
Soccerbase for Christopher Todd
Soccerbase for Chris Todd

1981 births
Living people
Footballers from Swansea
Welsh footballers
Association football defenders
Swansea City A.F.C. players
Drogheda United F.C. players
Exeter City F.C. players
Torquay United F.C. players
Salisbury City F.C. players
Newport County A.F.C. players
Forest Green Rovers F.C. players
Hereford United F.C. players
Eastleigh F.C. players
English Football League players
National League (English football) players
League of Ireland players
Gloucester City A.F.C. managers
Eastleigh F.C. managers
Welsh football managers
Torquay United F.C. non-playing staff
Yeovil Town F.C. non-playing staff